National Highway 758, commonly referred to as NH 758 is a national highway in  India. It is a spur road of National Highway 58. NH-758 traverses the state of Rajasthan in India.

Route 
Rajsamand - Kunwariya - Gangapur - Bhilwara - Ladpura.

Junctions  
 
  Terminal near Rajsamand.
  Terminal near Ladpura.

See also 
List of National Highways in India by highway number
List of National Highways in India by state

References

External links 

 NH 758 on OpenStreetMap

National highways in India
National Highways in Rajasthan